Rinodina is a genus of lichen-forming fungi in the family Physciaceae. The genus has a widespread distribution and contains about 265 species. It is hypothesized that a few saxicolous species common to dry regions of western North America, southern Europe, North Africa and central Asia may date back 240 million years to the Middle Triassic.

See also
List of Rinodina species.

References

Caliciales
Caliciales genera
Lichen genera
Taxa named by Erik Acharius
Taxa described in 1810